J, or j, is the tenth letter in the Latin alphabet, used in the modern English alphabet, the alphabets of other western European languages and others worldwide. Its usual name in English is jay (pronounced ), with a now-uncommon variant jy . When used in the International Phonetic Alphabet for the y sound, it may be called yod or jod (pronounced  or ).

History 

The letter J used to be used as the swash letter I, used for the letter I at the end of Roman numerals when following another I, as in XXIIJ or xxiij instead of XXIII or xxiii for the Roman numeral twenty-three. A distinctive usage emerged in Middle High German. Gian Giorgio Trissino (1478–1550) was the first to explicitly distinguish I and J as representing separate sounds, in his Ɛpistola del Trissino de le lettere nuωvamente aggiunte ne la lingua italiana ("Trissino's epistle about the letters recently added in the Italian language") of 1524.

Pronunciation and use

English 
In English,  most commonly represents the affricate .

In loanwords such as bijou or Dijon,  may represent , as in modern French. In some loanwords, including raj, Azerbaijan, Taj Mahal, and Beijing, the regular pronunciation  is actually closer to the native pronunciation, making the use of  an instance of hyperforeignism, a type of hypercorrection. Occasionally,  represents the original  sound, as in Hallelujah and fjord (see Yodh for details).

It is, however, quite common in proper nouns, especially personal names.

Other languages

Germanic and Eastern-European languages 
The great majority of Germanic languages, such as German, Dutch, Icelandic, Swedish, Danish and Norwegian, use  for the palatal approximant , which is usually represented by the letter  in English. Notable exceptions are English, Scots and (to a lesser degree) Luxembourgish.  also represents  in Albanian, and those Uralic, Slavic and Baltic languages that use the Latin alphabet, such as Hungarian, Finnish, Estonian, Polish, Czech, Serbo-Croatian, Slovak, Slovenian, Latvian and Lithuanian. Some related languages, such as Serbo-Croatian and Macedonian, also adopted  into the Cyrillic alphabet for the same purpose. Because of this standard, the lower case letter was chosen to be used in the IPA as the phonetic symbol for the sound.

Romance languages 
In the Romance languages,  has generally developed from its original palatal approximant value in Latin to some kind of fricative. In French, Portuguese, Catalan (except Valencian), and Romanian it has been fronted to the postalveolar fricative  (like  in English measure). In Valencian and Occitan it has the same sound as in English, .

Generally, ⟨j⟩ is not commonly present in modern standard Italian spelling. Only proper nouns (such as Jesi and Letojanni), Latin words (Juventus), or those borrowed from foreign languages have . Romanesco dialect   (garlic; cf. Italian aglio ). The Italian novelist Luigi Pirandello used  in vowel groups in his works written in Italian; he also wrote in his native Sicilian language, which still uses the letter  to represent  (and sometimes also [dʒ] or [gj], depending on its environment).

Other European Languages 

The Maltese language is a Semitic language, not a Romance language; but has been deeply influenced by them (especially Sicilian) and it uses  for the sound /j/ (cognate of the Semitic yod).

In Basque, the diaphoneme represented by  has a variety of realizations according to the regional dialect:  (the last one is typical of Gipuzkoa).

Non-European languages 
It represents a voiced palatal plosive  in Konkani, Yoruba, and Swahili. In Kiowa,  stands for a voiceless alveolar plosive, .

In Wade–Giles,  stands for Mandarin Chinese .

In romanized Pashto,  represents ځ, pronounced .

In Greenlandic and in the Qaniujaaqpait spelling of the Inuktitut language,  is used to transcribe .

Related characters 

 𐤉 : Semitic letter Yodh, from which the following symbols originally derive
 I i : Latin letter I, from which J derives
 ȷ : Dotless j
 ᶡ : Modifier letter small dotless j with stroke
 ᶨ : Modifier letter small j with crossed-tail
 IPA-specific symbols related to J:     
 Uralic Phonetic Alphabet-specific symbols related to J:

 J with diacritics: Ĵ ĵ J̌ ǰ Ɉ ɉ J̃ j̇̃

Computing codes 

1 Also for encodings based on ASCII, including the DOS, Windows, ISO-8859 and Macintosh families of encodings.

Unicode also has a dotless variant, ȷ (U+0237). It is primarily used in Landsmålsalfabet and in mathematics. It is not intended to be used with diacritics since the normal j is softdotted in Unicode (that is, the dot is removed if a diacritic is to be placed above; Unicode further states that, for example i+ ¨ ≠ ı+¨ and the same holds true for j and ȷ).

In Unicode, a duplicate of 'J' for use as a special phonetic character in historical Greek linguistics is encoded in the Greek script block as ϳ (Unicode U+03F3). It is used to denote the palatal glide  in the context of Greek script. It is called "Yot" in the Unicode standard, after the German name of the letter J. An uppercase version of this letter was added to the Unicode Standard at U+037F with the release of version 7.0 in June 2014.

Wingdings smiley issue 
In the Wingdings font by Microsoft, the letter "J" is rendered as a smiley face (this is distinct from the Unicode code point U+263A, which renders as ☺︎). In Microsoft applications, ":)" is automatically replaced by a smiley rendered in a specific font face when composing rich text documents or HTML email. This autocorrection feature can be switched off or changed to a Unicode smiley.

Other uses
 In international licence plate codes, J stands for Japan.
 In mathematics, j is one of the three imaginary units of quaternions.
 Also in mathematics, j is one of the three unit vectors. 
 In the Metric system, J is the symbol for the joule, the SI derived unit for energy.
 In some areas of physics, electrical engineering and related fields, j is the symbol for the imaginary unit (the square root of −1) (in other fields the letter i is used, but this would be ambiguous as it is also the symbol for current).
 A J can be a slang term for a joint (marijuana cigarette)
In the United Kingdom under the old system (before 2001), a licence plate that begins with "J" for example "J123 XYZ" would correspond to a vehicle registered between August 1, 1991 and July 31, 1992. Again under the old system, a licence plate that ends with "J" for example "ABC 123J" would correspond to a vehicle that was registered between August 1, 1970 and July 31, 1971.

Other representations

References

External links 

 
 
 

ISO basic Latin letters